De Leeuw van Vlaanderen or Leeuw van Vlaanderen may refer to:

The Flag of Flanders
De Vlaamse Leeuw, the Flemish regional anthem
Robert III, Count of Flanders (1249–1322)
De Leeuw van Vlaanderen (novel) (1838), by Hendrik Conscience
De Leeuw van Vlaanderen (film) (1985), based on the novel, written and directed by Hugo Claus